The flag of Alsace (Alsatian:  or , "red and white") is the original red and white flag of the region, and can be traced to the red and white banner of Gerard, Duke of Lorraine in the 11th century.

Particularly since the introduction of new French region Grand Est, the traditional  flag of Alsace has been widely promoted by the advocates of the Alsace autonomous movement.

History

(from the 11th century) 

Red and white colours are commonly found on the coat of arms of Alsatian cities such as Strasbourg, Mulhouse and Sélestat, and additionally of many Swiss cities, especially in the region of Basel-Landschaft.

Departmental and regional flags 
It was subsequently modified to a slightly different appearance, yet also representing the two departments. The flag is currently used by the European Collectivity of Alsace created in January 2021.

Recognition 
There is controversy around the recognition of the Alsatian flag.

With the purpose of "Francosizing" the region, the  has not been recognised by the French government.

Subsequently, the  has been widely used during protests against the creation of a new "super-region" Grand Est, gathering Champagne-Ardennes, Lorraine and Alsace, namely on Colmar's statue of liberty.

See also
Coat of arms of Alsace

References 

11th-century introductions
Flag
Flag
Red and white flags
Flags of France
Flags of Germany